Xenorhabdus kozodoii  is a bacterium from the genus of Xenorhabdus which has been isolated from the nematode Steinernema arenarium in Voronez in Russia and from the nematode Steinernema apuliae in Italy.

References

Further reading

External links
Type strain of Xenorhabdus kozodoii at BacDive -  the Bacterial Diversity Metadatabase	

Bacteria described in 2006